Marcus Nwambo Mokaké (born 30 November 1981 in Limbé, Cameroon) is a Cameroonian footballer who plays for RUS Ethe Belmont in Belgium.

Career

RUS Ethe Belmont
Mokaké joined RUS Ethe Belmont in Belgium on 1 January 2019.

References

External links
 
 
 
 Marcus Mokaké at Footballdatabase

1981 births
Living people
Cameroonian footballers
Cameroon international footballers
Cameroonian expatriate footballers
Expatriate footballers in France
Expatriate footballers in Greece
Association football midfielders
Ligue 1 players
Ligue 2 players
Football League (Greece) players
Fovu Baham players
CS Sedan Ardennes players
Canon Yaoundé players
Mount Cameroon F.C. players
Kavala F.C. players
Pierikos F.C. players
Veria F.C. players